Sedgman Lake Provincial Park is a provincial park operated by Ontario Parks located in the District of Thunder Bay, Ontario. Sedgman Lake was named May 5, 1960, in honour of World War II casualty Private Alfred Thomas Sedgman, who died while serving in the Canadian Army (Argyll & Sutherland Highlanders) on February 26, 1945.

References

External links

Provincial parks of Ontario
Parks in Thunder Bay District
Protected areas established in 1985
1985 establishments in Ontario